René Rydlewicz (born 18 July 1973) is a German professional football manager and a former player who played as a midfielder.

Playing career
Rydlewicz was born in Forst. He started his career as a youth team player for Chemie Döbern and went on to play with FC Energie Cottbus, Berliner FC Dynamo, and Bayer 04 Leverkusen in his later youth years. He signed his first professional contract at the age of 16 with BFC Dynamo and stayed with the club until 1990 when he signed for Bayer 04 Leverkusen. He stayed at Leverkusen for two years and made 15 appearances for the club. In the summer of 1994 he moved to TSV 1860 München played 28 games and two years later made the move back to Bayer 04 Leverkusen. In 1997, he was once again on the move, this time to Bundesliga club Arminia Bielefeld. He quickly established himself at the club and became the captain. He stayed with Bielefeld for three years and played 70 games for them before moving on to F.C. Hansa Rostock in the summer of 2000, where he played almost 200 games until 2008. He retired after playing one year for FC Anker Wismar.

Managerial career
In July 2008, Rydlewicz joined FC Anker Wismar as a director of football. On 1 March 2009, he took over the job as general manager of Hansa Rostock. He was sacked in May 2010 due to lack of success.

He was interim manager for Energie Cottbus. He took over on 8 May 2014 and lost the sole match in–charge. He again took over on 20 September 2015, and again, lost the sole match in–charge.

On 7 May 2016, he was named new manager of his former club BFC Dynamo. He was sacked in December 2018.

Managerial record

References

1973 births
Living people
Sportspeople from Forst (Lausitz)
People from Bezirk Cottbus
German footballers
Footballers from Brandenburg
Association football forwards
Germany under-21 international footballers
Berliner FC Dynamo players
Bayer 04 Leverkusen players
Bayer 04 Leverkusen II players
TSV 1860 Munich players
Arminia Bielefeld players
FC Hansa Rostock players
FC Anker Wismar players
Bundesliga players
2. Bundesliga players
DDR-Oberliga players
3. Liga managers
German football managers
Berliner FC Dynamo managers